The 2019–20 Binghamton Bearcats men's basketball team represented Binghamton University in the 2019–20 NCAA Division I men's basketball season. They played their home games at the Binghamton University Events Center in Vestal, New York and were led by eighth-year head coach Tommy Dempsey. They finished the season 10–19, 4–12 in America East play to finish in last place. 

On July 14, 2019, incoming sophomore and political science major Calistus Anyichie drowned in the upper portion of Buttermilk Falls State Park near Ithaca, New York.

Previous season
The Bearcats finished the 2018–19 season 10–23 overall, 5–11 in conference play to finish in seventh place. As the 7th seed in the 2019 America East men's basketball tournament, they upset 2nd seeded Stony Brook in the quarterfinals 78–72, then lost to top-seeded Vermont 51–84 in the semifinals.

Roster

Schedule and results

|-
!colspan=12 style=| Non-conference regular season

|-
!colspan=9 style=| America East Conference regular season

|-

Source

References

Binghamton Bearcats men's basketball seasons
Binghamton Bearcats
Bingham Bear
Bingham Bear